Socialist Alternative (SA) is a Trotskyist socialist political party in the United States. It describes itself as a Marxist organization, and a revolutionary party fighting for a democratic, socialist economy. Unlike reformist progressive groups, it argues that capitalism is fundamentally incapable of serving the interests of the majority of people.

Socialist Alternative's highest-profile public representative is Seattle City Councillor Kshama Sawant, who was elected in November 2013. It is active in over 50 cities in the United States, and campaigns for socialist issues. In September 2013, it began publishing a monthly newspaper, Socialist Alternative, along with various local newsletters and media outlets, including a radio show in the Boston area. It is a member of International Socialist Alternative, an international organization of Trotskyist parties.

History 
Socialist Alternative was officially formed as Labor Militant in 1986 by members of the Committee for a Workers' International who had moved to the United States and formed the Labor and Trade Union Group in the early 1980s. Labor Militant was a small group with its membership made mostly of trade union members. By the mid-1990s, Labor Militant became part of a campaign to form the Labor Party where it was in the leadership of the New York Metro Chapter. The New York Metro Chapter, the largest in the country, saw Labor Militant and its allies run again for the leadership of the chapter under the United Action slate only to be defeated in an Executive Committee election. Labor Militant members and the United Action slate had argued that the Labor Party should vigorously run candidates against the Democrats, whereas the national leadership of the Labor Party refused to take such an approach. After the election, the New York Labor Party State Executive upheld the election results while suspending the New York Metro Chapter and several of its officers, eventually shutting down the chapter.

In the late 1990s, Labor Militant changed its name to Socialist Alternative to reflect what was classified as a change in the political period. From 1998 to 2002, the Socialist Alternative party was active in the anti-globalization movement. It was present at many of the major protests during this time, including the N30 Protests in Seattle. At these protests, it argued that the movement should take up the key demands of "abolish the IMF, World Bank and the WTO", "cancel the international debt", "papers for all undocumented immigrants" and "take the banks and financial institutions into public ownership".

In 2004, Socialist Alternative party members initiated Youth Against War and Racism (YAWR) as a sustained campaign against the wars in Iraq and Afghanistan. YAWR worked mainly in high schools primarily in counter-recruitment activism in several cities. In 2005, several hundred Seattle's high school students walked out of class in order to march in protest of the war in Iraq causing conflict with parents and school officials who contended that the students should focus on school during the day. Following protests by members of YAWR and Socialist Alternative against military recruitment in schools, the Seattle School Board enacted some restrictions on military recruiters at Seattle high schools. The changes included limiting military recruiters to visiting twice a year to each school despite the demands by the YAWR protesters for a total ban on military recruitment at schools.

The Socialist Alternative party supported the candidacy of Ralph Nader during the 1996, 2000, 2004 and 2008 presidential elections. In the time leading up to the 2008 presidential election, the Socialist Alternative party criticized Barack Obama, pointing to his pro-free market stance on job creation, his record in congress of voting in favor of bills such as the Foreign Intelligence Surveillance Act, his stance on healthcare reform and on other issues.

In 2012, they supported Green Party candidate Jill Stein in her run. Despite criticism from other socialist groups about supporting "bourgeois candidates", Socialist Alternative argued that Stein supported a green New Deal jobs program, ending wars, canceling student debt, a single-payer health care system and other reforms supported by the party.

In 2013, the Socialist Alternative party garnered attention when it elected a member (Kshama Sawant) to the Seattle City Council—Sawant is one of the few elected socialists in the United States. In February 2017, Socialist Alternative reported that membership in the party had grown by more than 30% since the presidential election of Donald Trump.

Political positions

Trotskyism 
Socialist Alternative is a revolutionary party that advocates socialist democracy as an alternative to bureaucratic socialism of the former Soviet Union and the capitalist democratic model which it alleges is designed to only benefit the "ruling class and disenfranchise working people". The party proposes that a socialist society would change the relationship with "working people" running the economy.

The party holds that the former Soviet Union was not socialist, but instead a "tragic degeneration" of the Russian Revolution and the socialist tradition. While it views the Russian Revolution positively as a mass democratic revolution of the working class in Russia, it opposes Joseph Stalin's reign of terror following the death of Vladimir Lenin. Like other Leninist and Trotskyist parties, it upholds the principles of democratic centralism in order to ensure "bottom-up democracy" among party members. Writing in Seattle-based mynorthwest.com in 2019, right-libertarian radio personality Dori Monson said: "Socialist Alternative ... is a Communist group driven by Marxist principles. The people running Socialist Alternative would like to see a complete Marxist take-down of existing structures."

Campaigns

Jobs Not Cuts 
Socialist Alternative initiated a national campaign called Jobs Not Cuts in the fall of 2011 in reaction to the debt ceiling crisis and subsequent Budget Control Act passed by the Congress in August 2011. The bill called on the federal government to make $2.1 trillion in cuts to the federal budget and issued the formation of a Supercommittee to decide how these cuts would be made. The goal of the campaign was to hold a national week of action from November 16 to 23 in protest against these cuts and advocating for a mass public works project that could create jobs. Part of its demands were that the United States ended military involvement and the wars in Iraq and Afghanistan, and dramatic tax increases on the wealthy in order to fund the project.

Occupy movement 
When the Occupy movement began in the fall of 2011, Socialist Alternative became active within it in cities across the country, and issued a statement of solidarity. The party argued that the movement should develop concrete demands along working class lines.

Occupy Homes MN 
When the encampment at Occupy Minneapolis began to depreciate, Socialist Alternative shifted its focus into an anti-foreclosure campaign. The party assisted in outreach, planning and organizing public meetings to help grow the campaign.

15 Now 
After the election victory of Kshama Sawant and inspired by Proposition 1 in Sea-Tac, Socialist Alternative launched the 15 Now campaign. According to the campaign, their mission was to "empower working people and activate them into fighting movement" to win a $15-an-hour minimum wage. Led by Socialist Alternative, 15 Now in Seattle built a local campaign based on neighborhood action groups and won the endorsement of several major unions like SEIU, ATU, AFSCME and IBEW as well as community groups and national and local left-wing activists including Noam Chomsky, Tom Morello and Glen Ford of Black Agenda Report. It launched a signature drive to push an amendment to the Seattle City Charter for a $15 an hour minimum wage because a winnable ballot initiative was considered the best tool in order to get the wage instituted, but the decision to pursue a charter amendment saw the loss of support of many of 15 Now's labor allies.

On May 1, 2014, Seattle Mayor Ed Murray announced his proposal for a $15 an hour minimum wage to be considered for adoption by the Seattle City Council. 15 Now considered that this included what the party called many "corporate loopholes", but despite a fierce campaign, it eventually supported Kshama Sawant voting in favor of the Mayor's proposal as they had lost the resources necessary after many of the labor unions stopped supporting the movement. On June 2, the $15 an hour minimum wage was voted into law in the city, making Seattle the city with the highest minimum wage in the country at the time. Since 15 Now's work in Seattle, they initiated several different campaigns across the country, notably in Portland, Oregon, Minneapolis and Boston.

#Movement4Bernie 
In January 2016, Socialist Alternative launched an initiative in support of Vermont Senator Bernie Sanders's campaign for the Democratic Party presidential nomination. This campaign was called #Movement4Bernie. According to the organization's website, "to achieve Sanders' demands for $15 an hour, single-payer healthcare, tuition-free college and the end of mass incarceration it will take an organized mass movement."

Electoral history

Seattle City Council 
In 2013, Seattle Central Community College and Seattle University part-time economics professor Kshama Sawant was elected to the Seattle City Council from Position 2 as a candidate for Socialist Alternative. She had previously won 35% of the vote in the August primary election and advanced into the general election against incumbent Richard Conlin. On November 15, 2013, Conlin conceded to Sawant after late returns showed him down by 1,640 votes or approximately 1% of the vote. This made Sawant the first socialist to win a citywide election in Seattle since the communist supporter Anna Louise Strong was elected to the School Board in 1916. Sawant went on to be reelected in 2015 and 2019 with 56% and 51.8% of the vote respectively. Additionally, she defeated a recall in 2021 with 50.4% of the vote.

Sawant had previously run for election as the Socialist Alternative candidate in the 43rd district of the Washington House of Representatives against incumbent Democrat Frank Chopp in 2012. Sawant advanced past the primaries for Position 2 while also advancing in Position 1 where she was on the ballot challenging Jamie Pedersen. The Sawant campaign won a subsequent court battle against the Secretary of State for the right to list her party preference on the ballot in the elections. Sawant was endorsed by the Local 587 of the Amalgamated Transit Union and the alternative newspaper The Stranger. She received over 20,000 votes, or 29%.

Sawant's platform included a minimum wage increase to $15 an hour, rent control and taxes on higher-income individuals.

Washington State House 
In 2014, Socialist Alternative chose Jess Spear, an Organizing Director for one of their campaigns, to run for Washington State Representative against Speaker of the House Frank Chopp. Spear's platform included rent control, increasing education funding through increasing taxes on the wealthy and stopping the use of all fossil fuels in Washington. During her campaign, Spear led several protests against oil and coal trains moving through Seattle and was arrested after trespassing at one of the protests. Spear garnered 18% of the vote or roughly 8,600 votes in the 2014 general election.

Boston City Council 
In 2007, Matt Geary ran for Boston City Council as the Socialist Alternative candidate and received 3,025 votes (2%) in a plurality-at-large election in which each voter could vote for up to four candidates.

In 2013, Socialist Alternative ran registered nurse and union activist Seamus Whelan for City Council. In an unusually crowded municipal election including 19 candidates for City Councilor and 10 for Mayor, Whelan was eliminated in the preliminary election with over 3,000 votes. Whelan's main support was from working class areas in West Roxbury and Dorchester.

Minneapolis City Council 
In 2013, Ty Moore ran for Minneapolis City Council as the Socialist Alternative Candidate. He received support from SEIU MN State Council, Occupy Homes, the Green Party of Minneapolis, some immigrant rights organizers and some neighborhood leaders. Moore received 42% of the final vote and lost by a margin of 229 votes.

In early 2017, Ginger Jentzen launched a campaign for City Council in Ward 3 as a Socialist Alternative candidate. Jentzen won the first round with 3,290 votes before eventually finishing as runner-up once second (3,598) and third (3,844) place votes for eventual winner Steve Fletcher were tabulated under Minneapolis's ranked choice  voting system.

Labor unions 
Socialist Alternative has also fielded candidates for labor union leadership positions. In 2017, Socialist Alternative member Ryan Timlin was named President-elect of Amalgamated Transit Union Local 1005 in Minneapolis after running unopposed.

United States President 
While Socialist Alternative has yet to run its own presidential candidate, it endorsed Green Party US and Socialist Party USA candidate Howie Hawkins for the 2020 general election as a protest vote against the two major parties of the United States.

Newspaper and publications 
 Socialist Alternative – a national monthly newspaper
 Boston Organizer – a local bi-monthly newsletter produced in Boston, Massachusetts
 New York Socialist – a local bi-monthly newsletter produced in New York, New York
 The Battle of Wisconsin – "History and Lessons from the Working-class Revolt of 2011" by George Martin Fell Brown (February 2012)
 Challenging the Two-Party System – "Can a Left Alternative to Corporate Politics Be Built?" by Tony Wilsdon (September 2010)
 Save Our Schools – "The Fight to Defeat the Corporate Attack on Public Education" by Tom Crean (2010)
 It Doesn't Have to Be Like This – "Women and the Struggle for Socialism" by Christine Thomas (August 2010)
 Manifesto of the Fastfood Worker – by Tony Wilsdon and Brent Gaspaire (2013 edition)
 Trotsky's Relevance Today – by Peter Taaffe, Laurence Coates and Lynn Walsh (2000)

See also 

 American Left
 Democratic Socialists of America
 International Socialist Alternative
 Labor history of the United States
 Leon Trotsky
 Marxism
 Militant tendency
 Peter Taaffe
 Ted Grant
 Trade unionism
 Trotskyism

References

External links 
 Socialist Alternative

Anti-racist organizations in the United States
Political parties in the United States
Communist parties in the United States
Far-left politics in the United States
Non-interventionist parties
United States
Trotskyist parties in the United States
1986 establishments in the United States
Far-left political parties
Socialist parties in the United States